Kwanthai Sithmorseng (born August 18, 1984) is a professional boxer from Thailand. He fights in the strawweight division and is the former WBA Minimumweight World champion. He captured the title on November 5, 2010 by defeating Pigmy Kokietgym and lost it on April 19, 2011 to Muhammad Rachman by KO.

Early life
He began training in Muay Thai early on not knowing either of his parents.

Professional boxing record

See also 
 List of WBA world champions

References

External links 
 

Living people
World Boxing Association champions
Mini-flyweight boxers
World mini-flyweight boxing champions
1982 births
Kwanthai Sithmorseng
Kwanthai Sithmorseng